Leo Au  (born Au Chun Ming; February 1, 1990 in Hong Kong) is a retired professional squash player who represented Hong Kong. He reached a career-high world ranking of World No. 20 in July 2018.

On 5 May 2015, fourth seed Leo Au stunned the home crowd by outplaying Incheon Asian Games gold medallist Abdullah Al-Muzayen in three games (11-7, 11-9, 13-11) to win the 2015 Men's Asian Individual Squash Championships at Kuwait City.

References

External links 
 
 

1990 births
Living people
Hong Kong male squash players
Asian Games medalists in squash
Asian Games gold medalists for Hong Kong
Asian Games silver medalists for Hong Kong
Asian Games bronze medalists for Hong Kong
Squash players at the 2010 Asian Games
Squash players at the 2014 Asian Games
Squash players at the 2018 Asian Games
Medalists at the 2010 Asian Games
Medalists at the 2014 Asian Games
Medalists at the 2018 Asian Games
21st-century Hong Kong people